2016 Shillong Premier League was the 2016 edition of Shillong Premier League, top division football league in the Indian state of Meghalaya. The league began on 18 August with eight teams competing. It was known as the Geonee Shillong Premier League this season for sponsorship reasons.

Shillong Lajong were the defending champions.

Teams
 Langsning
 Meghalaya Police
 Malki
 Nangkiew Irat
 Nongkrem
 Rangdajied United
 Royal Wahingdoh
 Shillong Lajong

Table

Playoffs

First round

Semi-final

Final

References

External links
 Geonee sponsor Shillong Premier League.

Shillong Premier League
2016–17 in Indian football leagues